Carex mandoniana is a tussock-forming species of perennial sedge in the family Cyperaceae. It is native to western parts of South America.

The species was first formally described by the botanist Johann Otto Boeckeler in 1896 as a part of the work Allgemeine Botanische Zeitschrift für Systematik, Floristik, Pflanzengeographie. The type specimen was collected by Gilbert Mandon in 1859 in Bolivia.

See also
List of Carex species

References

mandoniana
Taxa named by Johann Otto Boeckeler
Plants described in 1896
Flora of Argentina
Flora of Ecuador
Flora of Peru
Flora of Bolivia